Clarks Beach is a small town of Auckland, New Zealand. It is in the former Franklin District local government area.

Primarily a beachside rural town, situated within the Manukau Harbour, at the mouth of the Waiuku River, it fronts the harbour and is north facing. It is known as one of the few beaches where scallops can be collected by hand at low tide.

About 50 ha immediately to the east of the existing town was rezoned to allow mixed housing in 2016. The Clarks Beach Waterfront Estate development started subsequently in 2019.

Seagrove aerodrome operated near Clarks Beach during World War II.

Demographics

Clarks Beach had a population of 1,428 at the 2018 New Zealand census, an increase of 69 people (5.1%) since the 2013 census, and an increase of 60 people (4.4%) since the 2006 census. There were 540 households, comprising 705 males and 720 females, giving a sex ratio of 0.98 males per female. The median age was 45.4 years (compared with 37.4 years nationally), with 261 people (18.3%) aged under 15 years, 210 (14.7%) aged 15 to 29, 684 (47.9%) aged 30 to 64, and 267 (18.7%) aged 65 or older.

Ethnicities were 91.8% European/Pākehā, 15.1% Māori, 4.2% Pacific peoples, 4.6% Asian, and 1.7% other ethnicities. People may identify with more than one ethnicity.

The percentage of people born overseas was 20.2, compared with 27.1% nationally.

Although some people chose not to answer the census's question about religious affiliation, 53.8% had no religion, 33.6% were Christian, 0.4% were Hindu, 0.4% were Buddhist and 2.1% had other religions.

Of those at least 15 years old, 204 (17.5%) people had a bachelor's or higher degree, and 240 (20.6%) people had no formal qualifications. The median income was $41,700, compared with $31,800 nationally. 297 people (25.4%) earned over $70,000 compared to 17.2% nationally. The employment status of those at least 15 was that 621 (53.2%) people were employed full-time, 156 (13.4%) were part-time, and 27 (2.3%) were unemployed.

References

Populated places in the Auckland Region
Populated places around the Manukau Harbour